Digital Distribution Netherlands (DDN) is a Dutch digital music distributor, based in the Netherlands and founded in 2011.

History
DDN started as an Amsterdam based music production company under the name Curves Music, composing music for content creators using freelance music producers. In its first year of business, the company branched a new distribution division under a new name, Digital Distribution Netherlands. In 2013, DDN dissolved the music production activities from its core business, while shifting its focus to ghost distribution. In 2013, the company took on a large number of record label accounts, releasing a wide catalogue of tracks and albums in that same year.

In 2015, the company started a division that specializes in managing the distribution of royalties for songs unrightfully used on digital services such as YouTube, using a database of song recordings and metadata for identification.

To date (2020), more than 12,000 releases have been administrated by DDN.

Distribution channels
DDN has distribution deals with the following services:

 7digital
 Amazon.com
 Beatport
 Dance All Day
 Deezer
 Deutsche Telekom AG (DTAG)
 Digitally Imported
 Feel Music / Musicaroma
 Google Play
 iTunes / Apple Music
 Juno Records Limited
 MediaNet
 Muve Music
 Nokia Corporation
 PYRO
 Rdio
 Rhapsody
 Shazam
 Spotify
 TIDAL
 Trackitdown.net / Beat.tv
 Traxsource
 Xbox Music
 YouTube / YouTube Red

References

External links
  Official website

Music publishing companies
Record label distributors
Digital audio distributors
Music organisations based in the Netherlands